Heiss may refer to:

 Heiss Island, an island in Franz Josef Land, Russia
 Marian Heiss Price (born 1938), Nebraska State Senator

People with the surname Heiss:
 Anita Heiss (born 1968), contemporary Indigenous Australian author
 Carol Heiss (born 1940), American figure skater
 Christopher Elias Heiss (1660–1731), German painter
 Michael Heiss (1818–1890), American Roman Catholic bishop
 William C. Heiss (born c. 1923), American athlete and coach

See also 

 Josef Heiß